The Islamic Republic of Iran Skating Federation (IRISF) is the governing body of ice hockey, inline hockey and roller sports in Iran.

History
The IRISF was accepted into the International Ice Hockey Federation (IIHF) on 26 September 2019. The IRISF has been a full member of the IIHF, as well as a member of World Skate, and has the right to vote in the General Assembly. The current president of the IRISF is Majid Honarjo.

See also
 Ice hockey in Iran
 Iran men's national ice hockey team
 Iran men's national inline hockey team

References

External links
 IIHF profile
 Official website 

Iran
Inline hockey in Iran
Iran
Skating